Guijo de Galisteo is a municipality located in the province of Cáceres, Extremadura, Spain. According to the 2008 census (INE), the municipality has a population of 1513 inhabitants.

Demographics

Villages
Guijo de Galisteo
Valrío, 400 inhabitants. Founded in the 1950s
El Batán, 850 inhabitants. Founded in the 1950s by the Instituto Nacional de Colonización

References

External links
Guijo de Galisteo estudia si es viable segregar El Batán y Valrío

Municipalities in the Province of Cáceres